Xenorhabdus khoisanae  is a bacterium from the genus of Xenorhabdus which has been isolated from the nematode Steinernema khoisanae in the Western Cape Province in South Africa.

References

Further reading

External links
Type strain of Xenorhabdus khoisanae at BacDive -  the Bacterial Diversity Metadatabase

Bacteria described in 2013